Events from the year 1930 in Italy.

Incumbents 

 King: Victor Emmanuel III
 Prime Minister: Benito Mussolini

Events 
21 November: A flying boat airliner I-RONY, operating on a passenger flight for Società Anonima Navigazione Aerea (SANA), disappears over the Mediterranean Sea during a flight from Barcelona, Spain, to Marseilles, France; all six people on board are lost.

Births
6 January: Alfonso Brescia, film director (d. 2001) 
19 January: Pellegrino Tomaso Ronchi, Roman Catholic prelate (d. 2018) 
11 February: Flaminia Jandolo, actress (d. 2019) 
6 March: Amos Cardarelli, Italian footballer (d. 2018)
25 April: Ugo Crescenzi, politician (d. 2017)
31 July: Nino Cristofori, politician (d. 2015) 
21 August: Filippo Illuminato, partisan, Gold Medal of Military Valour (d. 1943)
6 September: Daniele Barioni, operatic tenor
23 September: Edda Bresciani, Egyptologist
29 September: Cesare Barbetti, actor (d. 2006) 
8 October: Cosetta Greco, actress (d. 2002)
19 October: Lino Bortolo Belotti, Roman Catholic prelate (d. 2018)
3 December: Francesco Perrone, long-distance runner (d. 2020)
6 December: Carlo Reali, actor, voice actor and film editor
14 December: Rosanna Carteri, operatic soprano (d. 2020)

Deaths
3 February: Michele Bianchi, revolutionary syndicalist leader (b. 1883)
14 February: Salvatore Catalanotte, Sicilian-born US mobster (b. 1893)
15 February: Giulio Douhet, general and air power theorist (b. 1869)
30 June: Francesco Saverio Merlino, lawyer, anarchist activist and theorist of libertarian socialism (b. 1856)
1 September: Luigi Cangiullo, Olympic diver (b. 1897)
9 October: Enrico Forlanini, engineer, inventor and aeronautical pioneer (b. 1848)
30 October: Federico Andreotti, painter (b. 1847)
5 November: Luigi Facta, politician, 26th Prime Minister of Italy (b. 1861)

References 

 
1930s in Italy
Years of the 20th century in Italy